Dunalka Old Manor is a fortified late medieval manor house in , Dunalka Parish, South Kurzeme Municipality, in the historical region of Courland, in western Latvia.

See also
List of castles in Latvia

References 

Castles in Latvia
South Kurzeme Municipality
Courland